A signalman is a person who historically made signals using flags and light. In modern times, the role of signalmen has evolved and now usually uses electronic communication equipment. Signalmen usually work in rail transport networks, armed forces, or construction (to direct heavy equipment such as cranes). Many armed forces now use the rank of signaller instead. 

Transport occupations